Shirley Motshegoane Mokgotho is a South African politician, who was elected to the National Assembly of South Africa in the 2019 general election. Mokgotho is a member of the Economic Freedom Fighters.

She was sworn in as a Member of Parliament on 22 May 2019. On 6 May 2020, she became an alternate member of the Portfolio Committee on Human Settlements, Water and Sanitation.

References

External links
Biography at Parliament of South Africa

Living people
Year of birth missing (living people)
Economic Freedom Fighters politicians
Members of the National Assembly of South Africa
Women members of the National Assembly of South Africa